Kingwood is a city in and the county seat of Preston County, West Virginia, United States. The population was 2,980 at the 2020 census. It sits within the Allegheny Mountains and is part of the Morgantown metropolitan area. 

Kingwood is home to Hovatter's Wildlife Zoo, also knows as the West Virginia Zoo.

History

Kingwood was first settled in 1807 and established by the Virginia General Assembly on January 23, 1811. The town was made the county seat of the new Preston County in 1818 and chartered in 1853. It was named for a grove of tall, stately trees.

The James Clark McGrew House was listed on the National Register of Historic Places in 1993; the Kingwood Historic District was added in 1994.

Geography
Kingwood is located at  (39.4713, -79.6848).

It has a warm-summer humid continental climate (Dfb) and average monthly temperatures range from 28.7° F in January to 70.2° F in July. The local hardiness zone is 6a.

Demographics

2010 census
As of the census of 2010, there were 2,939 people, 1,291 households, and 818 families living in the city. The racial makeup of the city was 97.3% White, 0.9% African American, 0.1% Native American, 0.5% Asian, 0.1% from other races, and 1.0% from two or more races. Hispanic or Latino of any race were 0.5% of the population.

There were 1,291 households, of which 27.2% had children under the age of 18 living with them, 47.1% were married couples living together, 11.8% had a female householder with no husband present, 4.5% had a male householder with no wife present, and 36.6% were non-families. 30.5% of all households were made up of individuals, and 15.2% had someone living alone who was 65 years of age or older. The average household size was 2.28 and the average family size was 2.80.

The median age in the city was 43.8 years. 19.6% of residents were under the age of 18; 8.7% were between the ages of 18 and 24; 23.4% were from 25 to 44; 28.5% were from 45 to 64; and 19.9% were 65 years of age or older. The gender makeup of the city was 46.8% male and 53.2% female.

2000 census
As of the census of 2000, there were 2,944 people, 1,283 households, and 844 families living in the city. The population density was 1,192.9 people per square mile (460.2/km2). There were 1,417 housing units at an average density of 574.2 per square mile (221.5/km2). The racial makeup of the city was 97.69% White, 1.02% African American, 0.44% Asian, 0.07% from other races, and 0.78% from two or more races. Hispanic or Latino of any race were 0.34% of the population.

There were 1,283 households, out of which 28.7% had children under the age of 18 living with them, 50.5% were married couples living together, 12.3% had a female householder with no husband present, and 34.2% were non-families. 31.1% of all households were made up of individuals, and 15.6% had someone living alone who was 65 years of age or older. The average household size was 2.28 and the average family size was 2.83.

In the city, the population was spread out, with 22.3% under the age of 18, 7.5% from 18 to 24, 25.6% from 25 to 44, 26.3% from 45 to 64, and 18.3% who were 65 years of age or older. The median age was 42 years. For every 100 females, there were 84.1 males. For every 100 females age 18 and over, there were 81.8 males.

The median income for a household in the city was $29,155, and the median income for a family was $36,313. Males had a median income of $30,658 versus $18,190 for females. The per capita income for the city was $16,299. About 16.3% of families and 17.0% of the population were below the poverty line, including 25.2% of those under age 18 and 13.6% of those age 65 or over.

Education
Kingwood contains three public schools serviced by the Preston County School District:
 Kingwood Elementary School – grades K-4
 Central Preston Middle School – grades 5-8
 Preston High School – grades 9-12

Notable people
Robert E. Lee Allen, U.S. Representative from West Virginia’s 2nd district
William G. Brown Sr., U.S. Representative from Virginia’s 15th, Virginia’s 10th, and West Virginia’s 2nd district 
William Gay Brown Jr., U.S. Representative from West Virginia’s 2nd district
William G. Conley, 18th Governor of West Virginia
Robert E. Cowan, lawyer, member of the Virginia House of Delegates from Preston County
T. Stephen Crawford, chemical engineer known for his research in coal, coal tar and coal gasification
Jonathan P. Dolliver, U.S. Senator from Iowa
Robert Halbritter, member of the West Virginia House of Delegates and judge of the West Virginia Circuit Courts
Izetta Jewel, actress and women's rights advocate
Trena King, professional archer
James McGrew, U.S. Representative from West Virginia’s 2nd district and founding father of West Virginia
Melvin C. Snyder, U.S. Representative from West Virginia’s 2nd district and later judge
Christopher Sperandio, artist
David Sypolt, member of the West Virginia Senate from the 14th district
William B. Zinn, member of the Virginia and West Virginia House of Delegates and West Virginia Senate from Preston County and founding father of West Virginia

See also

 List of cities in West Virginia

References

External links

 

Cities in West Virginia
Cities in Preston County, West Virginia
County seats in West Virginia
Morgantown metropolitan area
Coal towns in West Virginia